Hagensborg, originally named Kristiania, is a small community in the Bella Coola Valley in British Columbia, Canada. Its census population in 2006 was 248.

History

The Bella Coola Valley was already the ancient home to the Nuxálk people when European explorers arrived. Norwegian settlers from Minnesota and Wisconsin arrived in 1894, and under the guidance of the Reverend Christian Saugstad established a colony. The colony was named "Hagen's Borg" after Hagen B. Christensen, the first storekeeper in the area and postmaster from April 1, 1896 to October 14, 1910. ("borg" is Norwegian for a fortress or castle).

Transportation

Hagensborg is served by Highway 20, which runs from Williams Lake to Bella Coola, at the mouth of the Bella Coola River on North Bentinck Arm. In oder to access the Bella Coola Valley via Highway 20, a portion of the drive known as "The Hill" or "The Precipice" must be traversed. This route is sitting at an elevation of 1487 metres and contains treacherous switchbacks and hairpin turns, shared by a single-lane gravel road.The Bella Coola Airport is located in Hagensborg, just East of Bella Coola.

Government
Hagensborg is not incorporated as a municipality.  Its local government representation is provided through the Central Coast Regional District (CCRD).  CCRD Electoral Areas "C" and "D" each include part of Hagensborg. The eastern portion is part of Electoral Area "C", while the western portion is part of Electoral Area "D".

Provincially, Hagensborg is in the North Coast riding, served by NDP MLA Jennifer Rice.

Federally, Hagensborg is in the riding of Skeena—Bulkley Valley, served by NDP MP Nathan Cullen.

There is a post office in Hagensborg, with postal code V0T 1H0.

Education

Hagensborg is home to the headquarters of School District 49 Central Coast, which administers three local schools (each of which is the only provincial school serving those grades in the Valley), Sir Alexander Mackenzie School (grades 8-12), Nustasum Elementary School (grades 5-7), and Bella Coola Elementary School (grades K-4). Acwsalcta School is independently run by the Nuxalk First Nation and teaches Indigenous students from kindergarten through Grade 12.

Services and locations of note

Hagensborg is located centrally with regard to the population distribution of the Bella Coola Valley.  As such, it provides some services, such as the airport, ambulance station, cemetery, swimming pool (summer only), Royal Canadian Legion hall and some accommodation and retail that serve the entire Valley.  In addition, it is the primary service centre for the eastern end of the Bella Coola Valley, and thus is home to a full-service grocery store, gas station, bed and breakfast, and other commercial services. Hagensborg is home to the Norwegian Heritage House, a preserved house built prior to 1900 by Andrew Svisdahl, an early Norwegian settler in the area.  The House has been outfitted as an interpretive centre.

References

External links
VR Panorama of school entrance in Hagensborg
Hagensborg entry in the Columbia Gazetteer of North America
Hagensborg on epodunk.com
Tourism BC - Hagensborg
Hagensborg A and B

Unincorporated settlements in British Columbia
Bella Coola Valley
Populated places in the Central Coast Regional District
Norwegian Canadian settlements
Designated places in British Columbia